Meeting Resistance is a 2007 documentary film about the Iraq War. The film presents the views of eleven Iraqi resistance fighters in the Adhamiyah neighborhood of Baghdad. The film was directed by journalists Molly Bingham (United States) and Steve Connors (UK).

The interviewees are all anonymous and (with one exception) faceless or out-of-focus on camera. They are presented as nicknames: The Teacher, The Warrior, The Traveler, The Imam, The Wife, The Syrian, The Fugitive, The Local, The Republican Guard, The Lieutenant, and The Professor.

The US military currently organizes showings for its forces in Iraq so they can know who they are fighting.

See also
BattleGround: 21 Days on the Empire's Edge

External links
Meeting Resistance Official website

Video
Interview with Bingham and Connors, from Democracy Now! program, October 18, 2007

2007 films
American documentary films
Documentary films about the Iraq War
American independent films
2000s Arabic-language films
2000s English-language films
2007 documentary films
2007 independent films
2007 multilingual films
American multilingual films
2000s American films